Emma Juliet Rice (born August 1967) is a British actor, director and writer. Hailed as a fearless director, Rice's work includes theatrical adaptations of Brief Encounter, The Red Shoes and Wise Children. In 2022, Rice was named in the Sky Arts Top 50 most influential British artists. Rice worked with Kneehigh Theatre in Cornwall for twenty years as an actor, director, then artistic director with co-artistic director, Mike Shepherd. She was the Artistic Director of Shakespeare's Globe from 2016-2018, before founding her own touring theatre company Wise Children.

Early life 
Rice was born in Oxfordshire and grew up in Nottingham where her mother was a social worker and her father was a lecturer in personnel management. After studying English and Stage Design at Harrington College Rice went on to study acting at the Guildhall School of Music and Drama.

Career 
After graduating from Guildhall, Rice spent eight years working with Alibi Theatre, performing theatre that emphasised storytelling . Alongside touring the UK and performing to children and communities with Alibi, Rice developed her craft, training in Poland, with Gardzienice, a company founded by Włodzimierz Staniewski.

In 1994 Rice joined the Cornish theatre company, Kneehigh, as a performer. After taking on increasing creative responsibilities, Kneehigh Artistic directors Bill Mitchell and Mike Shepherd encouraged her to direct and her first production, The Itch, was staged in 1999. As a director, Rice says that her long-running production of The Red Shoes represented the point in her career when she came into her own. Rice went on to become the Artistic Director of Kneehigh, alongside Mike Shepherd, and under their stewardship Kneehigh produced a plethora of adaptations and original work, including Tristan and Yseult, The Bacchae and a 'seedy, dreamy' take on Angela Carter's Nights at the Circus.  Whilst Rice's work did not always appease critics, Kneehigh's 'visually stunning, inventive, often subversive and unashamedly populist' shows toured in the UK and internationally.

In 2015 it was announced that Rice would take over from Dominic Dromgoole as artistic director of Shakespeare's Globe.  After a summer season that saw Rice's  A Midsummer Night's Dream and 'exceptionally strong' box office returns, it was announced in October 2016 that Rice would leave the Globe in April 2018. The announcement followed a decision by the theatre's board, which cited concerns over authenticity and her use of lighting technology.

In 2017 Rice announced her new touring theatre company, Wise Children. 
Standard Issue Magazine made her their woman of the year in 2016 for “her fearlessness, leadership, innovation and bravery”.

During the COVID-19 pandemic Rice's Wise Children live streamed a fully staged production to a global audience with their production of Romantics Anonymous which had been due to tour the US prior to the pandemic.  Alongside the live streams Rice also presents a podcast series looking behind the scenes of her work and process

In 2021, Rice directed an adaptation of Emily Brontë’s Wuthering Heights which toured at Bristol Old Vic and Theare Royal Brighton to strong reviews from critics.

In 2022 Rice was named in the Sky Arts Top 50 most influential British artists

External links 
 Wise Children Official Website

References

Date of birth missing (living people)
Living people
Cornish culture
English theatre directors
1967 births
Alumni of the Guildhall School of Music and Drama
Women theatre directors